Lowzdar-e Olya (also Romanized as Lowzdar-e ‘Olyā and Lūzdar-e ‘Olyā; also known as Lowzdar, Lowzdar-e Bālā, Luzdar, Lūzdarbā, and Nuzdār) is a village in Hendudur Rural District, Sarband District, Shazand County, Markazi Province, Iran. At the 2006 census, its population was 539, in 136 families.

References 

Populated places in Shazand County